Ephraim Bell Muttart (March 7, 1839 – June 26, 1912) was a physician and political figure in Prince Edward Island, Canada. He represented King's County in the House of Commons of Canada from 1878 to 1882 as a Conservative member.

He was born in Cape Traverse, Prince Edward Island, the son of John Muttart, of German origin, and Elizabeth Bell, a Scottish immigrant. Muttart was educated in P.E.I., in Sackville, New Brunswick and at Harvard University, receiving his M.D. there in 1861. Muttart set up practice in Souris. In 1863, he married a Miss McDonald. Muttart also was coroner and was medical referee for the Standard and Canada Life Assurance companies. He was unsuccessful in bids for reelection in 1882 and 1887. He died in Souris, Prince Edward Island in 1912.

References 

The Canadian parliamentary companion and annual register, 1881, CH Mackintosh

1839 births
1912 deaths
Harvard Medical School alumni
Members of the House of Commons of Canada from Prince Edward Island
Conservative Party of Canada (1867–1942) MPs
Physicians from Prince Edward Island
Canadian coroners
People from Souris, Prince Edward Island